AIETOH is a 1995 EP by Japanese group Super Junky Monkey. It showcased their fusion of rap, hardcore, punk, and funk music. It was released only in Japan.

Track listing
"A•I•E•T•O•H"
"Fuck That Noise"
"Time Is Culture"
"Blah, Blah, Blah"

Personnel 

 Mutsumi ‘623’ Fukuhara – vocals
 Keiko – guitar
 Shinobu Kawai – bass
 Matsudaaahh – drums

References

1995 EPs
Super Junky Monkey albums